Csongor Olteán (born 8 April 1984) is Hungarian javelin thrower who won the Hungarian national championship four consecutive times from 2006 to 2009.

Olteán participated at two World Championship in 2007 and 2009, however he failed to progress from the qualifiers on both occasions. He was also present at the 2008 Summer Olympics, but did not manage to come through the qualifying round.

References

External links
 

1984 births
Living people
People from Sfântu Gheorghe
Hungarian male javelin throwers
Athletes (track and field) at the 2008 Summer Olympics
Olympic athletes of Hungary